The Round Barn near Van Wert, Ohio, United States, is a round barn that was built in 1910.  It was listed on the National Register of Historic Places in 1980.

It may also have been known as the Clayton Hoover Round Barn.

References

Barns on the National Register of Historic Places in Ohio
National Register of Historic Places in Van Wert County, Ohio
Buildings and structures in Van Wert County, Ohio
Infrastructure completed in 1910
Round barns in Ohio